Kelibia (Kélibia), often referred to as Klibia or Gallipia  by European writers, is a coastal town on the Cap Bon peninsula, Nabeul Governorate in the far north-eastern part of Tunisia. Its sand beaches are considered some of the finest in the Mediterranean.

History 

Known in Roman times as Clypia or Clupea,  the town was founded by the Carthaginians as the fortified town of Aspis in the 5th century BC. The Siege of Aspis in 255BC was the first African battle of the First Punic War.

Clupea was also the seat of an ancient Christian bishopric.
At the Council of Carthage (411), which brought together Catholic and Donatist bishops, Clypia was represented by Bishop Leodicius and the Donatist Geminius. Aurilius was one of the bishops whom the Arian Vandal king Huneric summoned to Carthage in 484 and then exiled. Two other bishops of Clypia took part in the Council of Carthage (525) (Bishop Crescentius) and Council of Carthage (645) (Bishop Stephanus).

No longer a residential bishopric, Clypia is now listed by the Catholic Church as a titular see.

Sports 
Kelibia has one of the best Tunisian volleyball clubs with the Kelibia Olympic Club, founded in 1957 and active since 1959. The club scored two Tunisian championship titles in 1977 and 2003, eight cups in 1972, 1974, 1975, 1976, 1978, 1989, 2004 and 2011 and an Arab Cup of clubs' champions in 1998.

Culture 
Since 1964, Kélibia has hosted the Kelibia International Amateur Film Festival, the oldest of its kind in the country.

Kelibia today 

The main landmark of Kelibia is the recently restored Kelibia Fort overlooking the harbor. Kelibia is a fishing port and is home to Tunisia's National Fishing School. The town has a population of 52,000 (2014 census).

The 'Muscat de Kélibia', a fruity regional white wine is widely recognized as one of the best of the country.

Climate

Twin towns — sister cities

 Almuñécar, Spain
 Marsala, Italy
 Pantelleria, Italy

References

Notes

External links 
 Kelibia.net - Kelibia city web portal
 Lexicorient

Populated coastal places in Tunisia
Populated places in Tunisia
Communes of Tunisia
Phoenician colonies in Tunisia
Catholic titular sees in Africa
Ancient Greek geography of North Africa